Abu Bakr ibn Muhammad ibn Amr ibn Hazm (died 120/737) was an 8th-century Sunni Islamic scholar based in Madinah.

He is among those who compiled hadiths at Umar II’s behest. Umar asked him to write down all the hadiths he could learn in Madinah from 'Amra bint 'Abd al-Rahman, who was at the time the most respected scholar of hadiths narrated by Aisha.

See also
Abu Bakr (name)
Muhammad (name)
Hazm (name)

References

Sunni Muslim scholars of Islam
737 deaths
Year of birth unknown